Macrogastra ventricosa is a species of air-breathing land snail, a terrestrial pulmonate gastropod mollusc in the family Clausiliidae, the door snails. 

Subspecies
 Macrogastra ventricosa brancsiki H. Nordsieck, 2006
 Macrogastra ventricosa major (Rossmässler, 1836)
 Macrogastra ventricosa ventricosa (Draparnaud, 1801)

Distribution
This snail occurs in Northern and Central Europe:

 Norway
 Sweden
 Finland
 Estonia
 Latvia
 Lithuania
 Russian Kaliningrad Oblast
 Germany
 Poland
 Czech Republic
 Slovakia
 Switzerland
 Austria
 Hungary
 Slovenia
 Ukraine

Description
The weight of the adult live snail is about 111.9 mg.

References

 Bank, R. A.; Neubert, E. (2017). Checklist of the land and freshwater Gastropoda of Europe. Last update: July 16th, 2017.
 Sysoev, A. V. & Schileyko, A. A. (2009). Land snails and slugs of Russia and adjacent countries. Sofia/Moskva (Pensoft). 312 pp., 142 plates

External links
 
 Draparnaud, J.-P.-R. (1801). Tableau des mollusques terrestres et fluviatiles de la France. Montpellier / Paris (Renaud / Bossange, Masson & Besson). 1-116

Clausiliidae
Gastropods described in 1801